Thomas Jordan may refer to:

Sports
 Thomas Jordan (basketball) (born 1968), American professional basketball player
 Thomas Jordan (footballer), Barbadian football player and manager
 Thomas Jordan (sprinter) (born 1949), German former sprinter
 Tom Jordan (baseball) (1919–2019), American Major League Baseball catcher 
 Tom Jordan (footballer) (born 1981), Scottish semi-professional footballer
 Tom Jordan (rugby union) (born 1998), New Zealand rugby union player
 Tommy Jordan, Gaelic football manager

Other
 Thomas Jordan (economist) (born 1963), chairman of the governing board of the Swiss National Bank
 Thomas Jordan (general) (1819–1895), Confederate Army general
 Thomas Jordan (Medal of Honor) (1840–1930), American Civil War sailor and Medal of Honor recipient
 Thomas Jordan (MP), in 1397, MP for Bedford
 Thomas Jordan (poet) (died 1685), English poet
 Thomas Jordan (Royal Navy officer) (18th century), British naval officer
 Thomas Brown Jordan (1807–1890), British inventor and engineer
 Thomas H. Jordan (born 1948), American geophysicist
 Tom Jordan (actor) (1937-2019), Irish actor

See also
Jordan (name)